Bagous is a genus of snout and bark beetles in the family Curculionidae. There are at least 360 described species in Bagous.

See also
 List of Bagous species

References

Further reading

External links 
 
 

Curculionidae
Curculionidae genera